Iosif Varga (6 April 1941 – 22 May 1992) was a Romanian footballer who played as a forward and also was a manager.

Club career

Iosif Varga, nicknamed Piți was born on 4 December 1941 in Bucharest. At the age of 10 he went to play football at the junior squads of Dinamo București, where on 24 August 1958 he became the youngest player that scored in his Divizia A debut match, when at 16 years, 8 months and 20 days he scored a hat-trick against Steagul Roșu Brașov in a 6–0 victory. In 1961, coach Traian Ionescu used him as the team's game coordinator, helping the team win the 1961–62 Divizia A by scoring 4 goals in 15 appearances. In the next three seasons, Varga helped The Red Dogs win another three titles, at the first he contributed with 4 goals scored in 22 matches, in the second he played 8 games and in the third he appeared in two games, also during this time he helped the club win twice the Cupa României and made three appearances in the European Cup. In 1965, Varga went to play for Dinamo Pitești for a half year in which he played three Divizia A games, returning to Dinamo București, where he would spend another four seasons, winning a cup, making his last Divizia A appearance on 10 November 1968 in a 3–0 victory against Universitatea Cluj, a competition in which he has a total of 120 appearances and 29 goals scored. He ended his career by playing one season in West Germany's second tier, Regionalliga West at Wuppertaler SV, scoring 8 goals in 18 appearances. After he retired from playing football he worked at Dinamo's youth center where he taught and formed generations of players, which include Florin Răducioiu, Ioan Lupescu, Bogdan Stelea, Florin Prunea and Florin Tene. Iosif Varga died on 22 May 1992 in his native Bucharest at age 50.

International career
Iosif Varga played two friendly matches at international level for Romania, making his debut under coach Silviu Ploeșteanu in a 3–2 victory against East Germany. His second game was a 1–1 against Poland and he also played one match for Romania's Olympic team at the 1964 Summer Olympics qualifiers.

Honours
Dinamo București
Divizia A: 1961–62, 1962–63, 1963–64, 1964–65
Cupa României: 1958–59, 1963–64, 1967–68

References

External links
Iosif Varga at Labtof.ro

1941 births
1992 deaths
Romanian footballers
Romania international footballers
Association football forwards
Liga I players
FC Dinamo București players
FC Argeș Pitești players
Wuppertaler SV players
Romanian expatriate footballers
Expatriate footballers in West Germany
Romanian expatriate sportspeople in West Germany
Romanian football managers
FC Dinamo București managers
Footballers from Bucharest